Franz Birkfellner (born 20 November 1976) is an Austrian judoka.

Achievements

References
 

1976 births
Living people
Austrian male judoka
Judoka at the 2000 Summer Olympics
Olympic judoka of Austria
20th-century Austrian people
21st-century Austrian people